Uncial 0312 (in the Gregory-Aland numbering), is a Greek uncial manuscript of the New Testament. Palaeographically it has been assigned to the 3rd or 4th-century.

Description 

The codex contains a small texts of the Gospel of Luke 5:23-24.30-31; 7:9.17-18, on one fragment of the one parchment leaf. The original size of the leaf was only 12 by 10 cm.

The text is written in two columns per page, probably in 27 lines per page, in small uncial letters.

Currently it is dated by the INTF to the 3rd or 4th-century.

It is currently housed at the Christopher De Hamel Collection (Gk. Ms 2) at the Corpus Christi College in Cambridge.

See also 

 List of New Testament uncials
 Biblical manuscript
 Textual criticism

References

Further reading 

 Peter M. Head, "Five New Testament Manuscripts: Recently Discovered Fragments in a Private Collection in Cambridge", JTS, NS, 2008.

External links 
 Images from 0312 at the CSNTM
 "Continuation of the Manuscript List", Institute for New Testament Textual Research, University of Münster. Retrieved April 9, 2008

Greek New Testament uncials
3rd-century biblical manuscripts
Early Greek manuscripts of the New Testament